is a Japanese actress and voice actress from Shimotsuke, Tochigi. Komiya is known for starring as Yoko Usami/Yellow Buster in the 2012 Super Sentai series Tokumei Sentai Go-Busters and Dia Kurosawa in the multimedia project Love Live! Sunshine!!. She is currently affiliated with Box Corporation.

Filmography

TV dramas

Films

Stage

Original DVD

Animation

Dubbing
Famous in Love, Paige Townsen (Bella Thorne)

Photobooks
Summer Diary (夏日記) (2012)
Arisa (有紗) (2013)
Majestic (2018)
IO (2020)

References

External links
 
 

.

1994 births
Living people
Aqours members
Japanese gravure idols 
Japanese video game actresses
Japanese voice actresses
Voice actresses from Tochigi Prefecture
21st-century Japanese actresses
21st-century Japanese singers
21st-century Japanese women singers
People from Shimotsuke, Tochigi